2006–07 Pirveli Liga was the 18th season of the Georgian Pirveli Liga.

League standings

See also
2006–07 Umaglesi Liga
2006–07 Georgian Cup

External links
Georgia 2006/07 RSSSF

Erovnuli Liga 2 seasons
2006–07 in Georgian football
Georgia